Paphiopedilum ooii is named after Michael Ooi, a slipper orchid enthusiast from Malaysia.  The plant blooms in the spring to early summer with a spike that can reach up to 2 meters and produce up to 17 flowers.

Distribution 
Paphiopedilum ooii is found on the island of Borneo in the state of Sabah, Malaysia at elevations of 1050 meters. Plants are found on sharp cliffs growing in moss and leaf litter.  The area is subjected to heavy rain  from fall to early spring. The area is rarely dry and usually very foggy.

Culture 
Keep in moderate shade to bright light with intermediate to warm temperature from 60F to 86F. Use an open mix and keep humidity high from about 70 to 85%.  Water heavily during the fall to spring.

References 

ooii
Orchids of Malaysia
Orchids of Borneo
Flora of Sabah